Gustavo Majauskas (born 12 January 1966) is an Argentine weightlifter. He competed at the 1992 Summer Olympics and the 1996 Summer Olympics.

References

1966 births
Living people
Argentine male weightlifters
Olympic weightlifters of Argentina
Weightlifters at the 1992 Summer Olympics
Weightlifters at the 1996 Summer Olympics
Place of birth missing (living people)
Pan American Games medalists in weightlifting
Pan American Games silver medalists for Argentina
Weightlifters at the 1995 Pan American Games
20th-century Argentine people